Croceibacterium xixiisoli is a Gram-negative, aerobic and non-motile bacterium from the genus Croceibacterium which has been isolated from soil from the Xixi wetland from China.

References

External links
Type strain of Altererythrobacter xixiisoli at BacDive -  the Bacterial Diversity Metadatabase

Sphingomonadales
Bacteria described in 2017